This is a list of The Official UK Charts Company DVDs of 2008.
 The biggest selling DVD of the year was Mamma Mia!

Number ones

See also
UK DVD Chart

References

United Kingdom DVDs
Number-one DVDs